The British Welterweight Championship is the welterweight professional wrestling championship competed for throughout the British wrestling circuit.

The championship was recognised and defended on matches screened by UK national television network ITV as part of the professional wrestling slot on World of Sport as well as standalone broadcasts.  Pre-publicity for these championship match broadcasts was given in ITV's nationally published listings magazine TVTimes

History
A British Welterweight Championship was first set up in 1938 under All-In rules and won by Harold Angus. The Mountevans Committee in 1947 called for the establishment of a British Welterweight Title and so recognised the still-incumbent All In titleholder Angus as champion. This lineage was recognised by Joint Promotions following its 1952 formation. The title would later be transplanted to All Star Wrestling following champion Danny Collins' defection in the late 1980s, where it would remain active until the mid-1990s.  In the 21st century, revivals of the title have been hosted by The Wrestling Alliance in 2000-2003 and Revolution British Wrestling in 2003-2005 before most recently being contested for in LDN's Academy/Spirit League since 2006.

The title first became recognised by RBW in August 2003, when a decider contest was held between Spud and Jack Hazard which saw Spud crowned RBW's first British Welterweight Champion. The last RBW holder would be Kid Regis who would hold the belt at the time of RBW's eventual closedown in late 2005.

Regis continued to defend the Welterweight Championship on the indy circuit, eventually losing it to Tex Benedict in 2006 in LDN, who in turn lost it to current champion Alan Travis in 2008.

Title histories
This is the combined list of different versions of the British Welterweight Titles, each of which was probably the most significant version at the time. Each version may or may not be connected to another. However, all title changes are either actual or "official" unless indicated otherwise.

British independent circuit (1938-1953)

Joint Promotions (1953-1989)

All Star Wrestling (1989-1993)

The Wrestling Alliance (2002-2003)

Revolution British Wrestling (2003-2005)

LDN Wrestling (2006-present)

See also

Professional wrestling in the United Kingdom

References

External links
www.revolutionbritishwrestling.org.uk - Revolution British Wrestling's former official site (no longer active)
1StopWrestling's news and results archive

Welterweight wrestling championships
National professional wrestling championships
Professional wrestling in the United Kingdom
National championships in the United Kingdom